Ramón Mas Alpuente (1949–2015), best known as Moncho Alpuente, was a Spanish journalist, writer and musician.

Born on 23 May 1949 in Madrid, he studied journalism.

A noted figure of the Movida madrileña, he performed in several musical bands including Las Madres del Cordero, Desde Santurce a Bilbao Blues Band, Moncho Alpuente y Los Kwai and The Moncho Alpuente Experience.

One of the founders of Popular FM back in 1971, he had a long career in radio. A regular collaborator for El País and also Público in his later years, he stood out as unofficial chronicler of the city of Madrid, to which he dedicated hundreds of pieces at the local section of El País.

He died in Las Palmas de Gran Canaria on 21 March 2015.

Books

Television 
On television he began with the musical program Mundo Pop (1974) on Spanish Television, in which he was a director, presenter and scriptwriter. In subsequent years, he contributed regularly different spaces: 

 Tele-Magazine (1974-1975)
 Popgrama (1979-1980)
 What a night that year! (1987)
 Delusions of love (1989)
 The worst show of the week (1993)
 The commons (1999)
 Wyoming Rooftop (2005)

References 

Spanish journalists
1949 births
2015 deaths
Writers about Madrid